Trouvelot is a lunar impact crater located to the south of the Mare Frigoris. It was named after the French astronomer Étienne Trouvelot. It is a bowl-shaped formation with a higher albedo than its surroundings. The rim is roughly circular, but somewhat uneven. It has not been significantly eroded by subsequent impacts. The crater lies less than 10 kilometers to the south of the Vallis Alpes canyon formation.

Satellite craters
By convention these features are identified on lunar maps by placing the letter on the side of the crater midpoint that is closest to Trouvelot.

References

 
 
 
 
 
 
 
 
 
 
 

Impact craters on the Moon